Hong Kong is a station of the MTR metro system in Hong Kong. It is situated between Man Cheung Street and Harbour View Street, Central, Hong Kong Island, and sits underneath the International Finance Centre (IFC). It opened on 22 June 1998.

The walk between the two stations typically takes three to six minutes. The tunnels, which cross under Connaught Road Central, are equipped with moving walkways. Hong Kong station provides an in-town check-in service for flights departing Hong Kong International Airport and free shuttle bus services to most major hotels in the Central and Wan Chai areas.

History

Built as part of the Airport Railway project of the Airport Core Programme, Hong Kong station sits on land reclaimed from Victoria Harbour in the early 1990s. The construction contract (numbered 501) was awarded to Japanese contractor Aoki Corporation and began on 12 June 1995.

The station was designed by the Hong Kong office of Arup Associates in collaboration with Rocco Design Architects and Ove Arup and Partners. The engineering company Meinhardt Group designed the building services while Davis Langdon and Seah were cost consultants.

Hong Kong chief executive Tung Chee-hwa formally opened the Airport Railway by unveiling a plaque in the Hong Kong station concourse on 21 June 1998. The station opened for passenger service with the Tung Chung line on 22 June 1998. Airport Express service began on 6 July 1998, the same day the new Chek Lap Kok Airport opened.

Overrun tunnel
The Airport Railway Extended Overrun Tunnel, envisaged to be 500 metres upon completion, would extend the Tung Chung line and Airport Express tracks to the east of Hong Kong station. Such a tunnel would allow trains to change tracks at a crossover east of the station, rather than using the current crossover west of the station, thereby speeding up train turnaround times and increasing the overall capacity of the rail lines by allowing more trains to be run.

In 2011, under the Central Reclamation Phase III project, a 40-metre section of the tunnel was built. The remaining 460-metre section of the tunnel, along with a new ventilation building near Tamar Park, was proposed in 2020. At that time, it was anticipated that the tunnel would be commissioned in 2032.

Station layout 

Although two Airport Express platforms have been constructed, only Platform 1 is in use. For the convenience of passengers, a taxi rank and a hotel shuttle service are provided on the same level once the passenger has exited through the gates.

The Tung Chung line and Airport Express are located considerably far away from each other. The Tung Chung line concourse is located one level below the Airport Express platform. There, passengers have to take an escalator or elevator down one additional level to access the Tung Chung line trains. In addition, passengers transferring from the Tung Chung line (or other MTR lines at Central) to Airport Express line or vice versa need to exit the paid area and reenter through the designated Airport Express fare gates or vice versa.  If necessary, passengers seeking to transfer between Airport Express and the other lines serving Hong Kong and Central stations must purchase another ticket or top up their Octopus card to cover the cost of the next leg.  

In July 2007, MTR installed two "Self-service Point" machines, for the first time in Hong Kong, at the Tung Chung line platform. These unmanned machines help resolve passengers' issues such as having lost the ticket or being unable to use the Octopus card to exit. They also have a visual conference system so that the staff can assist passengers remotely.

Entrances and exits 
A1/A2: Two IFC 
B1/B2: Exchange Square I/II
C: Douglas Street
D: Exchange Square III
E1/E2: One IFC 
F: IFC Mall

Gallery

References 

Central, Hong Kong
MTR stations on Hong Kong Island
Airport Express (MTR)
Tung Chung line
Railway stations in Hong Kong opened in 1998